Boxmeer is a town and former municipality in upper southeastern Netherlands. Boxmeer as a municipality incorporated the former municipality of Beugen en Rijkevoort and that of Vierlingsbeek. In Overloon is the Overloon War Museum.

Boxmeer, Cuijk, Grave, Mill en Sint Hubert, and Sint Anthonis merged into the new municipality of Land van Cuijk on 1 January 2022.

Topography

Population centres 
The population in parts of the former municipality on 31 December 2020 was:

 Beugen 1,860
 Boxmeer 12,550
 Holthees 540
 Maashees 875
 Oeffelt 2,370
 Overloon, including Heikant 3,985
 Rijkevoort 1,665
 Sambeek 1,745
 Vierlingsbeek, including Groeningen 3,050
 Vortum-Mullem 705

Transport 
 Boxmeer railway station

Notable people 

 Dr Anna Terruwe (1911 in Vierlingsbeek – 2004) a Catholic psychiatrist who discovered emotional deprivation disorder
 Joannes Gijsen (1932 in Oeffelt – 2013) a Dutch bishop of the Roman Catholic Church, Bishop of Roermond and Reykjavík 
 Emile Roemer (born 1962 in Boxmeer) a Dutch politician
 Hugo van der Velden (born 1963 in Boxmeer) a Dutch art historian
 Charles Deenen (born 1970 in Holthees) a Dutch computer/video game audio director, music composer, sound designer and mixer
 Dionne Stax (born 1985 in Boxmeer) a Dutch journalist and newsreader

Sport 
 Sjaak Lucassen (born 1961 in Maashees) a Dutch long-distance motorcycle rider
 Niels Fleuren (born 1986 in Boxmeer) a Dutch professional footballer with 420 club caps
 Sander de Wijn (born 1990 in Boxmeer) a Dutch field hockey player, silver medallist at the 2012 Summer Olympics
 Kika van Es (born 1991 in Boxmeer) a Dutch football defender

Gallery

References

External links 

Former municipalities of North Brabant
Populated places in North Brabant
Municipalities of the Netherlands disestablished in 2022
Geography of Land van Cuijk